The Font Bureau, Inc. or Font Bureau is a digital type foundry based in Boston, Massachusetts, United States. The foundry is one of the leading designers of typefaces, specializing in type designs for magazine and newspaper publishers.

History
Font Bureau was founded in 1989 by Roger Black and David Berlow. Before founding Font Bureau, Roger Black was an established publications designer and consultant. David Berlow is a noted type designer. The New York Times Magazine, Newsweek, Esquire Magazine, Rolling Stone and the Wall Street Journal rank among Font Bureau's client list. Apart from Black and Berlow, other prominent designers at Font Bureau have included Tobias Frere-Jones, later of Hoefler & Frere-Jones and Frere-Jones Type, and Cyrus Highsmith, later of Occupant Fonts and Morisawa. Matthew Carter has been a frequent collaborator with the foundry. 

In October 2009, news sources reported that Font Bureau was "suing NBC Universal for at least $2 million over the entertainment company's use of its fonts." Font Bureau claimed NBC broke its license agreement in its use of the fonts Antenna, Bureau Grotesque and Interstate in marketing material.

Following the launch of Type Network in 2016, Font Bureau foundry would begin to focus primarily on type design and custom services, while the company's font licensing business, font development activities, and retail shop would be relocated to Type Network.

On July 6, 2016, The Font Bureau, Inc. announced all its retail typefaces are sold exclusively at Type Network, withdrawing sales in Fonts.com, MyFonts, FontShop.

Font Bureau withdrew their fonts from the Adobe Fonts library on June 15, 2020.

Typefaces
The following foundry types were issued by Font Foundry:

References

External links
The Font Bureau, Inc.
Type Network
Webtype
Foundry Type Fonts of German Type Foundries at the End of the Nazi Era

Commercial type foundries
Companies based in Boston
1989 establishments in Massachusetts
American companies established in 1989